The Iyinu Kaniput River is a tributary of Dana Lake (Eeyou Istchee Baie-James), in Regional County Municipality (RCM) of Eeyou Istchee Baie-James (municipality), in the administrative region of Nord-du-Québec, in the Canadian province of Quebec, in Canada.

The surface of the river is usually frozen from early November to mid-May, however, safe ice circulation is generally from mid-November to mid-April.

Geography 
The main hydrographic slopes near the Iyinu Kaniput River are:
North side: Dana Lake (Eeyou Istchee Baie-James), Du Tast Lake, Columbus Lake, Colomb River, Rupert River;
East side: Dana Lake (Eeyou Istchee Baie-James), Evans Lake, Broadback River;
South side: Pauschikushish Ewiwach River, Matawawaskweyau River, Muskiki River, Nottaway River, Soscumica Lake;
West side: Colomb Lake, Colomb River, Chabouillié Lake, Rodayer Lake, Dusaux Lake, Nottaway River.

The upper part of this river flows mainly in marsh area. Its source is located at:
 Northeast of a curve of the Nottaway River;
 Northwest of Lake Soscumica;
 South of the mouth of the Iyinu Kaniput River;
 West of Dana Lake (Eeyou Istchee Baie-James));
 Southwest of the mouth of Dana Lake (Eeyou Istchee Baie-James);
 North of downtown Matagami.

From its source, the "Iyinu Kaniput River" flows on  according to the following segments:
 to the North in a marsh zone (especially on the west side), to a creek (coming from the Southwest);
 Northeasterly to its mouth.

The "Iyinu Kaniput River" flows into a bay on the west shore of Dana Lake (Eeyou Istchee Baie-James). This lake in turn drains into Dana Lake (Eeyou Istchee Baie-James) which empties into a bay west of Evans Lake; this last stretch of water is crossed to the North by the Broadback River.

The mouth of the Iyinu Kaniput River is located at:
 Southwest of the mouth of Dana Lake (Eeyou Istchee Baie-James);
 Southwest of the mouth of Evans Lake
 North of Lake Soscumica;
 Southeast of the mouth of the Broadback River;
 North of downtown Matagami.

Toponymy 
The toponym "Iyinu Kaniput River" was formalized on October 5, 1982 at the Commission de toponymie du Québec

References

See also 
James Bay
Rupert Bay
Broadback River, a watercourse
Evans Lake, a body of water
Dana Lake (Eeyou Istchee Baie-James), a body of water
List of rivers of Quebec

Rivers of Nord-du-Québec
Broadback River drainage basin
Eeyou Istchee James Bay